August Reeben (11 November 1888 Vana-Kuuste Parish, Tartu County – 19 January 1973 Tartu) was an Estonian politician. He was a member of Estonian Constituent Assembly. He was a member of the assembly since 14 November 1919. He replaced Nikolai Raps. On 16 December 1919, he resigned his position and he was replaced by Rudolf Koil.

References

1888 births
1973 deaths
Members of the Estonian Constituent Assembly